is a Japanese boxer. He competed in the men's featherweight event at the 2000 Summer Olympics.

References

External links
 

1978 births
Living people
Japanese male boxers
Olympic boxers of Japan
Boxers at the 2000 Summer Olympics
Sportspeople from Hiroshima
Featherweight boxers